North China Theological Seminary (Abbreviated as NCTS) was one of the largest and well-known fundamentalist Protestant seminaries in mainland China in the first half of the twentieth century. It was founded in 1919 and was eventually merged into Nanjing Union Theological Seminary after the establishment of the People's Republic of China.

History 

The North China Theological Seminary was established in 1919 out of a split from the Shandong Christian University, the latter of which was divided over a number of theological and administrative issues. Watson Hayes, originally the acting dean of the theological college of Shandong Christian University, was trusted by Chinese churches and appointed as the first principal of North China Theological Seminary. Established during the fundamentalist-modernist controversy in North America, North China Theological Seminary placed the authority of the bible at a central place in the vision of the seminary. During the 1930s, some would even consider in the "Westminster Seminary of China," named as such due to the role that Westminster Theological Seminary in Philadelphia played in the fundamentalist-modernist controversy.

Chinese Christians played an important role in founding and leading the seminary, as well as providing for its financial needs.  Some of its most notable faculty include well-known Chinese Christians such as Ding Limei and Jia Yuming. Presbyterian missionaries associated with the seminary also took interest in the rise of independent Chinese evangelists such as John Sung, Watchman Nee, and Wang Mingdao, seeing their preaching as representing the "pure gospel" which called for repentance from one's sins.

In 1943, all the missionaries from the NCTS were arrested by the Japanese army during the Second Sino-Japanese War. In 1944, Watson Hayes died in a concentration camp. Though reopened in 1945, the NCTS was closed again in 1949 due to the Huaihai campaign.

In 1949, after Albert Dodd, the NCTS's former staff, and Hu Hongwen moved to Taiwan, he continued to operate a seminary called Chongzheng Christ Seminary, and later Oriental Seminary. It was until 1991 Hu Hongwen reestablished the NCTS in Taiwan and became its president.

See also 

 Watson Hayes
 Hunan Bible Institute
 Nanjing Union Theological Seminary
 Fundamentalist-Modernist Controversy

External link 

 Official Website of North China Theological Seminary

References 

Educational institutions established in 1919
20th century in China
Christian missions in China
Protestant seminaries and theological colleges
Protestantism in China
Protestantism in Taiwan